Ngāti Maru is a Māori iwi (tribe) of the Hauraki region of New Zealand. The stronghold of Ngāti Maru has been the Thames area. Ngāti Maru are descendants of Te Ngako, also known as Te Ngakohua, the son of Marutūāhu, after whom the tribe is named.

It is one of five tribes of the Marutūāhu confederation, the others being Ngāti Paoa, Ngāti Rongoū, Ngāti Tamaterā and Ngāti Whanaunga. The Marutūāhu tribes are descended from Marutūāhu, a son of Hotunui, who is said to have arrived in New Zealand on the Tainui canoe. The Marutūāhu tribes are therefore part of the Tainui group of tribes. The Marutūāhu confederation is also part of the Hauraki collective of tribes.

Te Ngako was younger than his half-brothers Tamatepō (whose descendants are Ngāti Rongoū), Tamaterā (whose descendants are Ngāti Tamaterā) and Whanaunga (whose descendants are Ngāti Whanaunga). Marutūāhu married two sisters, Hineurunga and Paremoehau. Hineurunga was the tuakana (eldest sister). This gave Te Ngako the mana of being tuakana to his older brothers. Hence the name given to the descendants of Te Ngako was not Ngāti Te Ngako but Ngāti Maru.

The Ngāti Maru of Taranaki are descended from Marutūāhu's brother Maruwharanui. The descendants of a third brother, Marukōpiri, settled on the Whanganui River.

During the 1850s Ngati Maru were one of the main tribes providing large supplies of food to the new capital Auckland. Gold was discovered near Thames in 1852 which quickly changed from a small Maori kainga to a large European town of 40,000 people. Initially opinion was divided among the tribe whether they should allow Europeans access but they decided in favour when a government agent agreed to confine miners to one area, create a Maori police force to enforce this and pay Ngati Maru for every licence sold by the government. When gold was found by the sons of a chief he sent them to Auckland to spread the news  and create a rush. Tension was created because under New Zealand law land on which gold was found could be purchased by the state. In some cases land was leased directly  from Maori by large mining firms. The early gold diggers found alluvial gold which they could obtain by simple tools but quickly this ran out and was replaced by firms installing stamper batteries crushing gold bearing quartz.

Ngati Maru did not get involved in the 1863-64 land wars conflict.

In pre-gold rush period the Ngati Maru population was estimated at about 310. After that, the population increased to 800 and by 1903 census the iwi had 1,350 members.

See also
List of Māori iwi

Footnotes

External links
Ngati Maru
Ngāti Maru (Hauraki) at Te Puni Kōkiri

 
Iwi and hapū